Ericolol is a beta blocker.

References

Beta blockers
Chloroarenes
Tert-butyl compounds